Sybra apicesignata is a species of beetle in the family Cerambycidae. It was described by Breuning and de Jong in 1941.

References

apicesignata
Beetles described in 1941